The Highland Park Ford Plant is a former Ford Motor Company factory located at 91 Manchester Avenue (at Woodward Avenue) in Highland Park, Michigan. It was the second American production facility for the Model T automobile and the first factory in history to assemble cars on a moving assembly line. It became a National Historic Landmark in 1978.

History 
The Highland Park Ford Plant was designed by Albert Kahn Associates in 1908 and was opened in 1910. Ford automotive production had previously taken place at the Ford Piquette Avenue Plant, where the first Model Ts were built.

The complex included offices, factories, a power plant and a foundry as part of Ford's strategy of integrating the supply chain. About 102 acres in size the Highland Park Plant was the largest manufacturing facility in the world at the time of its opening. Because of its spacious design, it set the precedent for many factories and production plants built thereafter.

Using division of labor, relentless cost-cutting and process optimization, the factory went through an experience curve to reduce price and increase volume. On October 7, 1913, the Highland Park Ford Plant became the first automobile production facility in the world to implement the moving assembly line. The new assembly line improved production time of the Model T from 728 to 93 minutes. The Highland Park assembly line lowered the price of the Model T from $700 in 1910 to $350 in 1917, making it an affordable automobile for most Americans. On January 5, 1914, Ford announced that factory wages would be raised from a daily rate of $2.34 to $5.00, and that daily shifts would be reduced from nine hours to eight. After the increase in pay, Ford claimed that the turnover rate of 31.9 percent in 1913 decreased to 1.4 percent in 1915. Ford offered nearly three times the wages paid at other unskilled manufacturing plants.

In the late 1920s, the open Model T went out of fashion and Ford moved automobile assembly to the River Rouge Plant complex in nearby Dearborn to focus on improving quality with the Model A. Automotive trim manufacturing and Fordson tractor assembly continued at the Highland Park plant. The 1,690 M4A3 Sherman tanks built by Ford from June, 1942 to September, 1943 were assembled in this factory, as well.

During the 1940s through 1960s, the Highland Park plant was a principal location for Ford U.S. tractor manufacture. In the 1970s, the Romeo, Michigan, plant increasingly displaced it for that role. By the mid-1990s neither plant was producing tractors or tractor parts, as Ford had sold off its tractor and implement interests in stages during the 1990-1993 period.

By 2011 it was being used by Ford Motor Company to store documents and for artifact storage for the Henry Ford Museum. A portion is also occupied by a Forman Mills clothing warehouse that opened in 2006.

Current status
The Woodward Avenue Action Association has a purchase agreement with the complex's owner, National Equity Corp., to pay $550,000 for two of eight buildings at the historic Ford manufacturing complex: a four-floor, 40,000-square-foot administration building and the 8,000-square-foot executive garage near it. The center would include a theater with continuous videos, informational kiosks, interpretive displays on automotive history and a gift/coffee/snack shop. It could also be a place where visitors could pick up historical automotive tours, such as the current tour offered by the Woodward group, "In the Steps of Henry".

In the media
The plant was used as a location for director Shawn Levy's 2011 Disney/Touchstone Pictures film Real Steel.

Gallery

See also

List of Ford factories

References

External links

The Moving Assembly Line Debuted at the Highland Park Plant, Historic Sites, Heritage, Ford Motor Company official site.
, May 1977.
Ford's Highland Park plant a manufacturing pioneer, MotorCities National Heritage Area, Detroit News article, May 21, 2009.
National Historic Landmarks in Michigan, Michigan Historical Center, State Historic Preservation Office, Michigan State Housing Development Authority.
Ford search results - Historic Sites Online, Michigan Historical Center, State Historic Preservation Office, Michigan State Housing Development Authority.

Ford factories
Former motor vehicle assembly plants
Motor vehicle assembly plants in Michigan
Highland Park, Michigan
Buildings and structures in Wayne County, Michigan
Albert Kahn (architect) buildings
Woodward Avenue
Industrial buildings and structures on the National Register of Historic Places in Michigan
Industrial buildings completed in 1910
1910 establishments in Michigan
Michigan State Historic Sites in Wayne County, Michigan
Motor vehicle manufacturing plants on the National Register of Historic Places
National Historic Landmarks in Metro Detroit
National Register of Historic Places in Wayne County, Michigan
Transportation buildings and structures on the National Register of Historic Places in Michigan
Unused buildings in Michigan
Mill architecture